Yasufumi is a masculine Japanese given name.

Possible writings
Yasufumi can be written using different combinations of kanji characters. Here are some examples:

康文, "healthy, literature"
康史, "healthy, history"
康郁, "healthy, aroma/to move"
靖文, "peaceful, literature"
靖史, "peaceful, history"
靖郁, "peaceful, aroma/to move"
安文, "tranquil, literature"
安史, "tranquil, history"
安郁, "tranquil, aroma/to move"
保文, "preserve, literature"
保史, "preserve, history"
保郁, "preserve, aroma/to move"
泰文, "peaceful, literature"
泰史, "peaceful, history"
泰郁, "peaceful, aroma/to move"
易文, "divination, literature"
易史, "divination, history"
恭文, "respectful, literature"

The name can also be written in hiragana やすふみ or katakana ヤスフミ.

Notable people with the name
, Japanese politician
, Japanese professional wrestler
, Japanese footballer
, Japanese politician
, Japanese actor
Yasufumi Yamamoto (born 1971), Japanese tennis player

Japanese masculine given names